Lassalleianum is a genus of ground beetles in the family Carabidae. There are at least two described species in Lassalleianum, found in Nepal.

Species
These two species belong to the genus Lassalleianum:
 Lassalleianum damhenvel Morvan, 1999
 Lassalleianum lassallei Morvan, 1999

References

Platyninae